Lethe sidonis, the  common woodbrown, is a species of Satyrinae butterfly found in the  Indomalayan realm (Tibet, Kulu to Sikkim Eastern  Himalayas India  North-East India  , South Shan States).

References

sidonis
Butterflies of Asia